Mary Jean "Lily" Tomlin (born September 1, 1939) is an American actress, comedian, writer, singer, and producer. She started her career as a stand-up comedian as well as performing off-Broadway during the 1960s. Her breakout role was on the variety show Rowan & Martin's Laugh-In from 1969 until 1973. She starred as Frankie Bergstein on the Netflix series Grace and Frankie, which debuted in 2015 and earned her nominations for four Primetime Emmy Awards, three Screen Actors Guild Awards, and a Golden Globe Award.

In 1975, Tomlin made her film debut with Robert Altman's Nashville, which earned her a nomination for the  Academy Award for Best Supporting Actress. In 1977, her performance as Margo Sperling in The Late Show won her the Silver Bear for Best Actress and nominations for the Golden Globe and BAFTA Award for Best Actress. Her other notable films include 9 to 5 (1980), All of Me (1984), Big Business (1988), Flirting with Disaster (1996), Tea with Mussolini (1999), I Heart Huckabees (2004), and Grandma (2015).

Her signature role was written by her then-partner (now wife), Jane Wagner, in a show titled The Search for Signs of Intelligent Life in the Universe which opened on Broadway in 1985 and won Tomlin the Tony Award for Best Lead Actress in a Play. She is also known as the voice of Ms. Frizzle on the children's series The Magic School Bus. She won her first Emmy Awards in 1974 for writing and producing her own television special, Lily. Tomlin won a Grammy Award for her 1972 comedy album This Is a Recording. In 2014, she was awarded a Kennedy Center Honor and in 2017 she received the Screen Actors Guild Life Achievement Award.

Early life
Tomlin was born in Detroit, Michigan, the daughter of Lillie Mae (née Ford; January 14, 1914July 12, 2005), a housewife and nurse's aide, and Guy Tomlin (March 3, 1913October 24, 1970), a factory worker. She has a younger brother named Richard Tomlin. Tomlin's parents were Southern Baptists who moved to Detroit from Paducah, Kentucky, during the Great Depression. Although she attended a Southern Baptist church as a child, she later grew to become irreligious. She is a 1957 graduate of Cass Technical High School. Tomlin attended Wayne State University and originally studied biology. She auditioned for a play, and it sparked her interest in a career in the theatre and she changed her major. After college, Tomlin began doing stand-up comedy in nightclubs in Detroit and later in New York City. She continued studying acting at the HB Studio.

Career 
Tomlin's first television appearance was on The Merv Griffin Show in 1965. A year later, she became a cast member on the short-lived third and final incarnation of The Garry Moore Show

Tomlin characters

In 1969, after a stint as a hostess on the ABC series Music Scene, Tomlin joined NBC's sketch comedy show Rowan and Martin's Laugh-In.  Signed as a replacement for the departing Judy Carne, Tomlin was an instant success on the already established program, in which in addition to appearing in general sketches and delivering comic gags, she began appearing as the regular characters she created; they became well known and she portrayed them outside of the show in later recordings and television specials:
 Ernestine was a brash, tough and uncompromising telephone operator who generally treated customers with little sympathy. Ernestine often snorted when she let loose a barbed response or heard something salacious; she also wore her hair in a 1940s hairstyle with a hairnet, although the character was contemporary. Her opening lines were often the comical "one ringy dingy... two ringy dingy", and, "Have I reached the party to whom I am speaking?" In the sketches, Ernestine was usually at her switchboard taking calls. She occasionally phoned her boyfriend, Vito, a telephone repair man, or her pal Phenicia, another operator. Tomlin reprised the role in 2016 for a TV ad as part of PETA's campaign against SeaWorld. Tomlin has also reprised the role on several episodes of Sesame Street.
  Edith Ann is a precocious five-and-a-half-year-old girl who waxes philosophical on everyday life, either about life as a kid or things for which she feels she has the answers, although she is too young to fully understand. She often ends her monologues with "And that's the truth", punctuating it with a noisy raspberry. Edith Ann sits in an oversized rocking chair (to make Tomlin seem child-sized) with her rag doll, Doris, and often talks of life at home with her battling parents and bullying older sister, Mary Jean (Lily Tomlin's given birth names). Edith Ann has an oversized, playfully aggressive dog named Buster and a boyfriend named Junior Phillips, a possibly unrequited love. (Only Edith Ann and "Doris" appear in the Edith Ann sketches.) Tomlin reprised the character for a series of sketches on Sesame Street in the 1970s, and voiced her in three prime-time cartoon specials in the 1990s (including Edith Ann: A Few Pieces of the Puzzle).
 Mrs. Judith Beasley is a housewife and mother from Calumet City, Illinois, who is often chosen for television commercials and offers "good consumer advice". She appears in the film The Incredible Shrinking Woman as the lead character's neighbor.
 Mrs. Earbore (The Tasteful Lady) is a somewhat prudish and prissy, conservatively dressed middle-aged apolitical woman who dispenses advice on gracious living and a life of elegance.
 Susie the Sorority Girl is a blonde collegiate who could be the Tasteful Lady's daughter. Humorless and melodramatic, her biggest worries are the likes of who took her missing album by The Carpenters.
The Consumer Advocate Lady is a dour, austere woman who rigidly inspects and tests products for their alleged value.  The Consumer Advocate Lady is something of a variation of Mrs. Beasley.
 Lucille the Rubber Freak is a woman addicted to eating rubber, whose monologue details her habit from its beginning (chewing the eraser on pencils) to her obsessive rock bottom (eating the tip off mother's cane). Tomlin performed this character as part of her Laugh-In audition.
 Tess/Trudy is a homeless bag lady who accosts theater-goers and various passers-by with her offbeat observations and tales of communications with extraterrestrials. ("They don't care if you believe in 'em or not—they're different from God.")
 Bobbi-Jeanine is a showbiz veteran of the lounge circuit where she sings and plays organ. She often dispenses advice. ("It's not called Show Art, it's Show Business.)

Tomlin was one of the first female comedians to break out in male drag with her characters Tommy Velour and Rick. In 1982, but later popularized by a January 22, 1983 Saturday Night Live appearance, she premiered Pervis Hawkins, a black rhythm-and-blues soul singer (patterned after Luther Vandross), with a mustache, beard, and close-cropped afro hairstyle, dressed in a three-piece suit. Tomlin used very little, if any, skin-darkening cosmetics as part of the character, instead depending on stage lighting to create the effect.

In 1970, AT&T offered Tomlin $500,000 to play her character Ernestine in a commercial, but she declined, saying it would compromise her artistic integrity. In 1976, she appeared on Saturday Night Live as Ernestine in a Ma Bell advertisement parody in which she proclaimed, "We don't care, we don't have to...we're the phone company." The character later made a guest appearance at The Superhighway Summit at UCLA on January 11, 1994, interrupting a speech being given on the information superhighway by then-Vice President Al Gore. She appeared as three of her minor characters in a 1998 ad campaign for Fidelity Investments that did not include Ernestine or Edith Ann. In 2003, she made two commercials as an "updated" Ernestine for WebEx.

Tomlin brought Edith Ann to the forefront again in the 1990s with three animated prime-time television specials. She published Edith Ann's "autobiography" My Life (1995), co-written with Jane Wagner.

Recordings 
In 1972, Tomlin released This Is A Recording, her first comedy album on Polydor Records in 1972 that contained Ernestine's run-ins with customers over the phone. The album hit No. 15 on the Billboard Hot 200, becoming (and remaining ) the highest-charting album ever by a solo comedienne.  She earned a Grammy award that year for Best Comedy Recording.

Tomlin's second album, 1972's And That's The Truth, featuring her character Edith Ann, was nearly as successful, peaking at No. 41 on the chart and earning another Grammy nomination. (Tomlin has two of the  three top charting female comedy albums on Billboard, sandwiching a 1983 Joan Rivers release.)

Tomlin's third comedy album, 1975's Modern Scream, a parody of movie magazines and celebrity interviews featured her performing as multiple characters, including Ernestine, Edith Ann, Judith, and Suzie.  Her 1977 release Lily Tomlin On Stage, was an adaptation of her Broadway show that year. Each of these albums earned Tomlin additional Grammy nominations.

Tomlin recorded a single/EP called "The Last Duet" with Barry Manilow.

Motion pictures 

Tomlin made her dramatic debut in Robert Altman's Nashville, for which she was nominated for a Golden Globe Award for Best Supporting Actress and an Academy Award for Best Supporting Actress; she played Linnea Reese, a straitlaced, gospel-singing mother of two deaf children who has an affair with a womanizing country singer (played by Keith Carradine). The Oscar that year went to Lee Grant for her role in Shampoo. A comedy-mystery, The Late Show, teaming Tomlin with Art Carney, was a critical success in 1977. One of the few widely panned projects of Tomlin's career was 1978's Moment by Moment, directed and written by Wagner, which teamed Tomlin in a cross-generational older woman/younger man romance with John Travolta.

In 1980, Tomlin co-starred in 9 to 5, in which she played a secretary named Violet Newstead who joins coworkers Jane Fonda and Dolly Parton in seeking revenge on their boss, Franklin M. Hart, Jr., played by Dabney Coleman. The film was one of the year's top-grossing films. Tomlin then starred in the 1981 science fiction comedy, The Incredible Shrinking Woman, playing three roles (a fourth, a reprise of her Edith Ann character was cut from the theatrical print, but footage of this character was included in some later TV showings.)  The film, a send-up of consumerism, was written by Wagner, and met with mixed reviews.  Tomlin bounced back with the critical and financial hit All of Me, opposite Steve Martin, in which she played sickly heiress whose spirit became trapped in Martin's body.

Tomlin and Bette Midler played two pairs of identical twins who were switched at birth in the 1988 comedy, Big Business. Tomlin also played chain-smoking waitress Doreen Piggott in Altman's 1993 ensemble film Short Cuts, based on stories by Raymond Carver. Tomlin performed in two films by director David O. Russell; she appeared as a peacenik Raku artist in Flirting with Disaster and later, as an existential detective in I Heart Huckabees. In March 2007, two videos were leaked onto YouTube portraying on-set arguments between Russell and Tomlin, in which among other things he called her sexist names. When the Miami New Times asked Tomlin about the videos, she responded, "I love David. There was a lot of pressure in making the movie—even the way it came out you could see it was a very free-associative, crazy movie, and David was under a tremendous amount of pressure. And he's a very free-form kind of guy anyway."

Tomlin collaborated again with director Robert Altman in what would prove to be his last film, A Prairie Home Companion (2006). She played Rhonda Johnson, one-half of a middle-aged Midwestern singing duo partnered with Meryl Streep. Tomlin provided a voice for the film Ponyo on the Cliff by the Sea, which was released in August 2009.

In 2015, Tomlin starred in filmmaker Paul Weitz's film, Grandma, which Weitz said was inspired by Tomlin. It garnered rave reviews, and earned Tomlin a Golden Globe Award nomination.

Broadway and stage shows 
In March 1977, Tomlin made her Broadway debut in the solo show Appearing Nitely, which she co-wrote and co-directed with Jane Wagner, at the Biltmore Theatre. She received a Special Tony Award for this production. The same month, she made the cover of Time with the headline "America's New Queen of Comedy". Her solo show then toured the country and was made into a record album titled On Stage. In 1985, Tomlin starred in another one-woman Broadway show The Search for Signs of Intelligent Life in the Universe, written by her long-time life partner, writer/producer Jane Wagner. The show won her a Tony Award and was made into a feature film in 1991. Tomlin revived the show for a run on Broadway in 2000 which then toured the country through mid-2002. In 1989, she won the Sarah Siddons Award for her work in Chicago theatre. Tomlin premiered her one-woman show Not Playing with a Full Deck at the MGM Grand in Las Vegas in November 2009. It was her first appearance in that city, though she did tape an Emmy-winning TV special, a spoof of Las Vegas called Lily: Sold Out which premiered on CBS in January 1981.

Return to television 
Tomlin voiced Ms. Valerie Frizzle on the animated television series The Magic School Bus from 1994 to 1997. Also, in the 1990s, Tomlin appeared on the popular sitcom Murphy Brown as the title character's boss. In 1995 she appeared on an episode of "Homicide" as a murder suspect being transported to Baltimore. She also guest starred on The X-Files in 1998, in episode 6 ("How The Ghosts Stole Christmas") of season 6 as a ghost haunting an old mansion. In 2005 and 2006, she had a recurring role as Will Truman's boss Margot on Will & Grace. She appeared on the dramatic series The West Wing for four years (2002–2006) in the recurring role of presidential secretary Deborah Fiderer.

In the 2008–2009 fifth season of Desperate Housewives, she had a recurring role as Roberta, the sister of Mrs. McCluskey (played by Kathryn Joosten who coincidentally had played Tomlin's secretarial predecessor on The West Wing). During the 2008 Emmy Awards, Tomlin appeared as part of a tribute to the influential 1960s television series Laugh-In. Tomlin voiced Tammy in the 2005 The Simpsons episode "The Last of the Red Hat Mamas". Since its launch in 2008, Tomlin has been a contributor for wowOwow.com, a website for women to talk culture, politics, and gossip.Tomlin and Kathryn Joosten were in talks to star in a Desperate Housewives spin-off, which was given the green light in May 2009. The series plan was scrapped due to Joosten's illness, a recurrence of lung cancer; Joosten died on June 2, 2012, twenty days after the onscreen death from cancer of her character Karen McCluskey. In 2010, Tomlin guest-starred as Marilyn Tobin in the third season of Damages opposite Glenn Close, for which she was nominated for an Emmy. She also appeared in the NCIS episode titled "The Penelope Papers", playing Penelope Langston, the grandmother of Agent Timothy McGee (Sean Murray). In 2012, Tomlin guest starred on the HBO series Eastbound and Down as Tammy Powers, mother of the main character Kenny Powers, and appeared in three episodes of Season 3.

Tomlin co-starred with Reba McEntire in the TV series Malibu Country as Reba's character's mother Lillie Mae. The series started shooting in August 2012 with a premiere date of November 2, 2012, at 8:30 pm ET but was canceled in 2013 after 18 episodes.

Tomlin starred opposite Jane Fonda, Martin Sheen, and Sam Waterston in the Netflix original series Grace and Frankie. Tomlin plays Frankie Bergstein, recently separated from her husband of forty years (Waterston) while Fonda plays Grace Hanson, recently separated from her husband (Sheen). Grace and Frankie become reluctant friends after learning their husbands are leaving them to be with one another. She received her first Emmy nomination in 2015 as a lead actress for the role.

Tomlin reprised her role as Professor Frizzle in the 2017 Netflix sequel The Magic School Bus Rides Again, a continuation of the original series.

Personal life 

Tomlin met her future wife, writer Jane Wagner, in March 1971. After watching the after-school TV special J.T. written by Wagner, Tomlin invited Wagner to Los Angeles to collaborate on Tomlin's comedy LP album And That’s The Truth. The couple did not have a formal coming out. Tomlin said in 2006:

Tomlin stated in 2008, "Everybody in the industry was certainly aware of my sexuality and of Jane ... in interviews, I always reference Jane and talk about Jane, but they don't always write about it." In 2015, Tomlin said, "I wasn’t totally forthcoming. Everybody in the business knew I was gay, and certainly everybody I worked with and everything like that." Tomlin has been generally quiet about her sexuality.

On December 31, 2013, Tomlin and Wagner married in a private ceremony in Los Angeles after 42 years together.

Tomlin has been involved in a number of feminist and gay-friendly film productions, and on her 1975 album Modern Scream she pokes fun at straight actors who make a point of distancing themselves from their gay and lesbian charactersanswering the pseudo-interview question, she replies: "How did it feel to play a heterosexual? I've seen these women all my life, I know how they walk, I know how they talk ..."

In 2013, Tomlin and Wagner worked together on the film An Apology to Elephants, which Wagner wrote and Tomlin narrated.

Awards 

Tomlin has received numerous awards, including: four primetime Emmys; a special 1977 Tony when she was appearing in her one-woman Broadway show, Appearing Nitely; a second Tony as Best Actress, two Drama Desk Awards and an Outer Critics Circle Award for her one-woman performance in Jane Wagner's The Search for Signs of Intelligent Life in the Universe; a CableACE Award for executive producing the film adaptation of The Search; a Grammy Award for her comedy album, This is a Recording (a collection of Ernestine the Telephone Operator routines) as well as nominations for her subsequent albums Modern Scream, And That's the Truth, and On Stage; and two Peabody Awards — the first for the ABC television special, Edith Ann's Christmas: Just Say Noël and the second for narrating and executive producing the HBO film, The Celluloid Closet.

In 1992, she was awarded the Women in Film Crystal Award. Tomlin was inducted into the Michigan Women's Hall of Fame in 1998. In 2003, she was awarded the Mark Twain Prize for American Humor. Also in 2003, she was recognized again by Women in Film with the Lucy Award in recognition of her excellence and innovation in her creative works that have enhanced the perception of women through the medium of television. In March 2009, Tomlin received Fenway Health's Dr. Susan M. Love Award for her contributions to women's health.

On March 16, 2012, Lily Tomlin and her partner Jane Wagner received the 345th star on the Walk of Stars in Palm Springs, California.

In December 2014, she was one of five honorees for the annual Kennedy Center Honors. In January 2017 Tomlin won the Lifetime Achievement Award at the 23rd annual Screen Actors Guild ceremony.

Selected list 
Tony Awards
 1986 Best Actress in a Play, The Search for Signs of Intelligent Life in the Universe
 1977 Special Tony Award, Lifetime Achievement

Grammy Awards
 1972 Best Comedy Album, This Is A Recording

Emmy Awards
Tomlin has won six Emmy awards and a Daytime Emmy:
 1981 Outstanding Variety, Music or Comedy Series, Lily: Sold Out (ABC)
 Lily Tomlin, executive producer and star; Rocco Urbisci, producer; Jane Wagner, executive producer
 1974 Primetime Emmy Award for Outstanding Comedy-Variety, Variety or Music Special, Lily (1973) (CBS)
 Jerry McPhie, Irene Pinn, Herbert Sargent

 Outstanding Writing—Comedy-Variety or Music Special
 1974 Lily (CBS)
 Rosalyn Drexler, Ann Elder, Karyl Geld, Robert Illes,  Lorne Michaels, Richard Pryor, Jim Rusk, Herb Sargent, James R. Stein, Lily Tomlin, Jane Wagner, Rod Warren, George Yanok, writers
 1976 Lily Tomlin (ABC)
 Ann Elder, Christopher Guest, Lorne Michaels, Earl Pomerantz, Jim Rusk, Lily Tomlin, Jane Wagner, Rod Warren, George Yanok, writers. Additionally, Lily (1973; above), in which she starred but did not produce, won for Outstanding Comedy-Variety, Variety Or Music Special, 1974 Jerry McPhie, Herb Sargent, producers; Irene Pinn, executive producer
 1978 The Paul Simon Special (NBC)
 Chevy Chase, Tom Davis, Al Franken, Charles Grodin, Lorne Michaels, Paul Simon, Lily Tomlin, Alan Zweibel, writers
 Outstanding Voice-Over Performance
 2013 An Apology to Elephants
 Daytime Emmy Award
 1995 Outstanding Performer in an Animated Program, The Magic School Bus: Season 1

Screen Actors Guild Awards
 2017 Lifetime Achievement Award

Filmography

Works and publications 
 Tomlin, Lily, and Jane Wagner. On Stage. New York, N.Y.: Arista, 1977. Recorded live at the Biltmore Theatre, New York City. Audio book on LP. .
 Wagner, Jane, Elon Soltes, Wendy Apple, and Lily Tomlin. Appearing Nitely. Valley Village, Calif.: Tomlin and Wagner Theatricalz, 1992. Recorded live at the Huntington Hartford Theater in Los Angeles, Calif. Originally produced for television in 1978. Video recording. .
 Wagner, Jane. Edith Ann: My Life, So Far. New York: Hyperion, 1994. As told to and illustrated by Jane Wagner. . .
 Tomlin, Lily, Jane Wagner, and Anna Deavere Smith. Conversation with Lily Tomlin and Jane Wagner, October 25, 1994. San Francisco: City Arts & Lectures, Inc, 1994. Masonic Auditorium. 
 Wagner, Jane. J.T. New York: Carousel Films, 2000. DVD. Originally broadcast in 1969. Jeannette Du Bois, Theresa Merritt, Kevin Hooks. .
 Tomlin, Lily, and Jane Wagner. And That's the Truth. United States: Universal Music Enterprises, 2003. Recorded live at The Ice House, Pasadena, March 1976. Audio book. 
 Tomlin, Lily, and Jane Wagner. The Search for Signs of Intelligent Life in the Universe. Tarzana, Calif.: Laugh.com, 2005. 1992 HBO television film. A film adaptation of the Broadway play by Jane Wagner. .
 Wagner, Jane, Marilyn French, and Lily Tomlin. The Search for Signs of Intelligent Life in the Universe. New York, NY: ItBooks, an imprint of HarperCollinsPublishers, 2012. Reprint. Originally published: New York: Harper & Row, 1986. Based on the Broadway play written by Wagner starring Lily Tomlin. Includes an Afterword by Marilyn French and Reflections by Lily Tomlin and by Jane Wagner. . .
 Wagner, Jane C., and Tina DiFeliciantonio. Girls Like Us. New York, NY: Women Make Movies, 2013. Originally produced as a motion picture documentary film in 1997. DVD. .

References

External links 

 
 
 
 
 

1939 births
Living people
20th-century American actresses
21st-century American actresses
Actresses from Los Angeles
American film actresses
American sketch comedians
American stand-up comedians
American television actresses
American voice actresses
American women comedians
Audiobook narrators
Cass Technical High School alumni
Drama Desk Award winners
Feminist artists
Feminist comedians
Grammy Award winners
Kennedy Center honorees
American lesbian actresses
Lesbian comedians
LGBT people from California
LGBT people from Michigan
American LGBT rights activists
Mark Twain Prize recipients
Actresses from Detroit
Primetime Emmy Award winners
Silver Bear for Best Actress winners
Special Tony Award recipients
Tony Award winners
Volpi Cup winners
Wayne State University alumni
Comedians from California
Activists from California
American LGBT comedians